Orthohantavirus is a genus of single-stranded, enveloped, negative-sense RNA viruses in the family Hantaviridae within the order Bunyavirales. Members of this genus may be called orthohantaviruses or simply hantaviruses.

Orthohantaviruses typically cause chronic asymptomatic infection in rodents. Humans may become infected with hantaviruses through contact with rodent urine, saliva, or feces. Some strains cause potentially fatal diseases in humans, such as hantavirus hemorrhagic fever with renal syndrome (HFRS), or hantavirus pulmonary syndrome (HPS), also known as hantavirus cardiopulmonary syndrome (HCPS), while others have not been associated with known human disease (e.g. Prospect Hill virus). HPS (HCPS) is a "rare respiratory illness associated with the inhalation of aerosolized rodent excreta (urine and feces) contaminated by hantavirus particles."

Human infections of hantaviruses have almost entirely been linked to human contact with rodent excrement; however, in 2005 and 2019, human-to-human transmission of the Andes virus was reported in South America.

Orthohantaviruses are named for the Greek word ortho- meaning "straight" or "true" and for the Hantan River in South Korea, where the first member species (Hantaan virus) was identified and isolated in 1976 by Ho Wang Lee.

Disease

Hantavirus infections in humans are associated with two diseases: hemorrhagic fever with renal syndrome (HFRS) and hantavirus pulmonary syndrome (HPS), caused by Old World and New World hantaviruses, respectively. A common feature of the two diseases is increased vascular permeability, which causes hypotension, thrombocytopenia, and leukocytosis. The pulmonary illness is the more fatal of the two, whereas the hemorrhagic fever is much more common. Treatment for both is primarily supportive as there is no specific treatment for hantavirus infections. While many hantaviruses cause either of the two diseases, some are not known to cause illness, such as the Prospect Hill orthohantavirus.

Hemorrhagic fever with renal syndrome

Hemorrhagic fever with renal syndrome (HFRS) is caused chiefly by hantaviruses in Asia and Europe. Clinical presentation varies from subclinical to fatal, depending on the virus. After an incubation period of 2–4 weeks, the typical illness starts with non-specific symptoms such as high fever, chills, headache, backache, abdominal pains, nausea, and vomiting. After the initial period, bleeding under the skin begins, often paired with low blood pressure, followed by further internal bleeding throughout the body. Renal dysfunction leading to further health issues begins thereafter, which may cause death. A more mild form of HFRS that occurs in Europe is called "nephropathia epidemica" (NE). Trench nephritis during World War I is now thought to have been HFRS.

Hantavirus pulmonary syndrome

Hantavirus pulmonary syndrome (HPS), also called hantavirus cardiopulmonary syndrome (HCPS), is usually caused by hantaviruses in the Americas. Its incubation period ranges from 16 to 24 days. Illness initially shows similar symptoms as HFRS. After a few days of non-specific symptoms, sudden onset of progressive, or productive, coughing, shortness of breath, and elevated heart rate occur due to fluid buildup in the lungs. These symptoms are accompanied by impairment of lymphoid organs. Death from cardiovascular shock may occur rapidly after the appearance of severe symptoms. While HCPS is typically associated with New World hantaviruses, the Puumala orthohantavirus in Europe has also caused the syndrome on rare occasions.

Transmission
Hantaviruses are transmitted by contact with the bodily fluids of rodents, particularly from saliva from bites and especially from inhalation of viral particles from urine and feces in aerosols. The manner of transmission is the same for both diseases caused by hantaviruses. Among the HCPS-causing hantaviruses is the Andes orthohantavirus, which is the only hantavirus confirmed to be capable of spreading from person to person, though this is rare.

Characteristics

Structure
Hantavirus virions are about 120–160 nm in diameter. The lipid bilayer of the viral envelope is about 5 nm thick and is embedded with viral surface proteins to which sugar residues are attached. These glycoproteins, known as Gn and Gc, are encoded by the M segment of the viral genome. They tend to associate (heterodimerize) with each other and have both an interior tail and an exterior domain that extends to about 6 nm beyond the envelope surface.

Inside the envelope are the nucleocapsids. These are composed of many copies of the nucleocapsid protein N, which interact with the three segments of the viral genome to form helical structures. The virally encoded RNA polymerase is also found in the interior. By mass, the virion is greater than 50% protein, 20–30% lipid, and 2–7% carbohydrate. The density of the virions is 1.18 g/cm3. These features are common to all members of the family Hantaviridae.

Genome
The genome of hantaviruses is negative-sense, single-stranded RNA. Their genomes are composed of three segments: the small (S), medium (M), and large (L) segments. The S segment, 1-3 kilobases (kb) in length, encodes for the nucleocapsid (N) protein. The M segment, 3.2-4.9 kb in length, encodes a glycoprotein precursor polyprotein that is co-translationally cleaved into the envelope glycoproteins Gn and Gc, alternatively called G1 and G2. The L segment, 6.8–12 kb in length, encodes the L protein which functions primarily as the viral RNA-dependent RNA polymerase used for transcription and replication.

Within virions, the genomic RNAs of hantaviruses are thought to complex with the N protein to form helical nucleocapsids, the RNA component of which circularizes due to sequence complementarity between the 5' and 3' terminal sequences of genomic segments.

As with other Bunyavirales, each of the three segments has a consensus 3'-terminal nucleotide sequence (AUCAUCAUC), which is complementary to the 5'-terminal sequence and is distinct from those of the other four genera in the family. These sequences appear to form panhandle structure which seem likely to play a role in replication and encapsidation facilitated by binding with the viral nucleocapsid (N) protein. The large segment is 6530–6550 nucleotides (nt) in length, the medium is 3613–3707 nt in length and the small is 1696–2083 nt in length.

No nonstructural proteins are known, unlike the other genera in this family. At the 5' and 3' of each segment are short noncoding sequences: the noncoding segment in all sequences at the 5' end is 37–51 nt. The 3' noncoding regions differ: L segment 38–43 nt; M segment 168–229 nt; and S segment 370–730 nt. The 3' end of the S segment is conserved between the genera suggesting a functional role.

Lifecycle

Viral entry into host cells initiates by binding to surface cell receptors. Integrins are considered to be the main receptors for hantaviruses in vitro, but complement decay-accelerating factor (DAF) and globular heads of complement C1q receptor (gC1qR) have mediated attachment in cultured cells too. Entry may proceed through a number of possible routes, including clathrin-dependent endocytosis, clathrin-independent receptor-mediated endocytosis, and micropinocytosis. Viral particles are then transported to late endosomes. Gc-mediated membrane fusion with the endosomal membrane, triggered by low pH, releases the nucleocapsid into the cytoplasm.

After the release of the nucleocapsids into cytoplasm, the complexes are targeted to the endoplasmic reticulum–Golgi intermediate compartments (ERGIC) through microtubular-associated movement resulting in the formation of viral factories at ERGIC.

These factories then facilitate transcription and subsequent translation of the viral proteins. Transcription of viral genes must be initiated by association of the L protein with the three nucleocapsid species. In addition to transcriptase and replicase functions, the viral L protein is also thought to have an endonuclease activity that cleaves cellular messenger RNAs (mRNAs) for the production of capped primers used to initiate transcription of viral mRNAs. As a result of this cap snatching, the mRNAs of hantaviruses are capped and contain nontemplated 5'-terminal extensions.

The G1 (or Gn) and G2 (Gc) glycoproteins form hetero-oligomers and are then transported from the endoplasmic reticulum to the Golgi complex, where glycosylation is completed. The L protein produces nascent genomes by replication via a positive-sense RNA intermediate. Hantavirus virions are believed to assemble by association of nucleocapsids with glycoproteins embedded in the membranes of the Golgi, followed by budding into the Golgi cisternae. Nascent virions are then transported in secretory vesicles to the plasma membrane and released by exocytosis.

Pathogenesis
The pathogenesis of hantavirus infections is unclear as there is a lack of animal models to describe it (rats and mice do not seem to acquire severe disease). While the primary site of viral replication in the body is not known, in HFRS the main effect is in the blood vessels while in HPS most symptoms are associated with the lungs. In HFRS, there are increased vascular permeability and decreased blood pressure due to endothelial dysfunction and the most dramatic damage is seen in the kidneys, whereas in HPS, the lungs, spleen, and gall bladder are most affected. Early symptoms of HPS tend to present similarly to the flu (muscle aches, fever and fatigue) and usually appear around 2 to 3 weeks after exposure. Later stages of the disease (about 4 to 10 days after symptoms start) include difficulty breathing, shortness of breath and coughing.

Evolution
Findings of significant congruence between phylogenies of hantaviruses and phylogenies of their rodent reservoirs have led to the theory that rodents, although infected by the virus, are not harmed by it because of long-standing hantavirus–rodent host coevolution, although findings in 2008 led to new hypotheses regarding hantavirus evolution.

Various hantaviruses have been found to infect multiple rodent species, and cases of cross-species transmission (host switching) have been recorded.  Additionally, rates of substitution based on nucleotide sequence data reveal that hantavirus clades and rodent subfamilies may not have diverged at the same time.  Furthermore, as of 2007 hantaviruses have been found in multiple species of non-rodent shrews and moles.

Taking into account the inconsistencies in the theory of coevolution, it was proposed in 2009 that the patterns seen in hantaviruses in relation to their reservoirs could be attributed to preferential host switching directed by geographical proximity and adaptation to specific host types. Another proposal from 2010 is that geographical clustering of hantavirus sequences may have been caused by an isolation-by-distance mechanism. Upon comparison of the hantaviruses found in hosts of orders Rodentia and Eulipotyphla, it was proposed in 2011 that the hantavirus evolutionary history is a mix of both host switching and codivergence and that ancestral shrews or moles, rather than rodents, may have been the early original hosts of ancient hantaviruses.

A Bayesian analysis in 2014 suggested a common origin for these viruses ~2000 years ago. The association with particular rodent families appears to have been more recent. The viruses carried by the subfamilies Arvicolinae and Murinae originated in Asia 500–700 years ago. These subsequently spread to Africa, Europe, North America and Siberia possibly carried by their hosts. The species infecting the subfamily Neotominae evolved 500–600 years ago in Central America and then spread toward North America. The species infecting Sigmodontinae evolved in Brazil 400 years ago. Their ancestors may have been a Neotominae-associated virus from northern South America.

The evolution of shrew-borne hantaviruses appears to have involved natural occurrences of homologous recombination events and the reassortment of genome segments.  The evolution of Tula orthohantavirus carried by the European common vole also appears to have involved homologous recombination events.

Taxonomy
Orthohantaviruses belong to the family Hantaviridae and members of both the genus and the family are called hantaviruses. The genus also belongs to the subfamily Mammantavirinae, the mammalian hantaviruses, with three other genera. Orthohantaviruses specifically are mammalian hantaviruses that are transmitted among rodents. The genus contains these 38 species:

 Andes orthohantavirus
 Asama orthohantavirus
 Asikkala orthohantavirus
 Bayou orthohantavirus
 Black Creek Canal orthohantavirus
 Bowe orthohantavirus
 Bruges orthohantavirus
 Cano Delgadito orthohantavirus
 Cao Bang orthohantavirus
 Choclo orthohantavirus
 Dabieshan orthohantavirus
 Dobrava-Belgrade orthohantavirus
 El Moro Canyon orthohantavirus
 Fugong orthohantavirus
 Fusong orthohantavirus
 Hantaan orthohantavirus
 Jeju orthohantavirus
 Kenkeme orthohantavirus
 Khabarovsk orthohantavirus
 Laguna Negra orthohantavirus
 Luxi orthohantavirus
 Maporal orthohantavirus
 Montano orthohantavirus
 Necocli orthohantavirus
 Oxbow orthohantavirus
 Prospect Hill orthohantavirus
 Puumala orthohantavirus
 Robina orthohantavirus
 Rockport orthohantavirus
 Sangassou orthohantavirus
 Seewis orhtohantavirus
 Seoul orthohantavirus
 Sin Nombre orthohantavirus
 Tatenale orthohantavirus
 Thailand orthohantavirus
 Tigray orthohantavirus
 Tula orthohantavirus
 Yakeshi orthohantavirus

Hantaviruses that were formerly classified as species in this genus and which were not reassigned as member viruses of any existing species include:
 Isla Vista hantavirus, also called Isla Vista virus
 Muleshoe hantavirus, also called Muleshoe virus
 Rio Segundo hantavirus, also called Rio Segundo virus

Prevention
According to the U.S. CDC, the best prevention against contracting hantavirus is to eliminate or minimize contact with rodents in the home, workplace, or campsite.  As the virus can be transmitted by rodent saliva, excretions, and bites, control of rats and mice in areas frequented by humans is key for disease prevention. General prevention can be accomplished by disposing of rodent nests, sealing any cracks and holes in homes where mice or rats could enter, setting traps, or laying down poisons or using natural predators such as cats in the home.

The duration that hantaviruses remain infectious in the environment varies based on factors such as the rodent's diet, temperature, humidity, and whether indoors or outdoors. The viruses have been demonstrated to remain active for 2–3 days at normal room temperature, while ultraviolet rays in direct sunlight kill them within a few hours. Rodent droppings or urine of indeterminate age, though, should always be treated as infectious.

Vaccine

, no vaccines against hantaviruses have been approved by the U.S. FDA, but whole virus inactivated bivalent vaccines against Hantaan virus and Seoul virus are available in China and South Korea. In both countries, the use of the vaccine, combined with other preventive measures, has significantly reduced the incidence of hantavirus infections. Apart from these vaccines, four types of vaccines have been researched: DNA vaccines targeting the M genome segment and the S genome segment, subunit vaccines that use recombinant Gn, Gc, and N proteins of the virus, virus vector vaccines that have recombinant hantavirus proteins inserted in them, and virus-like particle vaccines that contain viral proteins, but lack genetic material. Of these, only DNA vaccines have entered into clinical trials.

Treatment
Ribavirin may be a drug for HPS and HFRS, but its effectiveness remains unknown; still, spontaneous recovery is possible with supportive treatment. People with suspected hantavirus infection may be admitted to a hospital, and given oxygen and mechanical ventilation support to help them breathe during the acute pulmonary stage with severe respiratory distress. Immunotherapy, administration of human neutralizing antibodies during acute phases of hantavirus, has been studied only in mice, hamsters, and rats. No controlled clinical trials have been reported.

Epidemiology
Hantavirus infections have been reported from all continents except Australia. Regions especially affected by HFRS include China, the Korean Peninsula, Russia (Hantaan, Puumala, and Seoul viruses), and Northern and Western Europe (Puumala and Dobrava virus). Regions with the highest incidences of hantavirus pulmonary syndrome include Argentina, Chile, Brazil, the United States, Canada, and Panama.

Africa
In 2010, a novel hantavirus, Sangassou virus, was isolated in Africa, which causes HFRS.

Asia
In China, Hong Kong, the Korean Peninsula, and Russia, HFRS is caused by Hantaan, Puumala, and Seoul viruses.

China
In March 2020, a man from Yunnan tested positive for hantavirus. He died while travelling to Shandong for work on a chartered bus. According to the Global Times reports, around 32 other people have been tested for the virus.

Australia
,  no human infections have been reported in Australia, though rodents were found to carry antibodies.

Europe
In Europe, two hantaviruses – Puumala and Dobrava-Belgrade viruses – are known to cause HFRS. Puumala usually causes a generally mild disease, nephropathia epidemica, which typically presents with fever, headache, gastrointestinal symptoms, impaired renal function, and blurred vision. Dobrava infections are similar, except that they often also have hemorrhagic complications.

Puumala virus is carried by its rodent host, the bank vole (Clethrionomys glareolus), and is present throughout most of Europe, except for the Mediterranean region. Four Dobrava virus genotypes are known, each carried by a different rodent species. Genotype Dobrava is found in the yellow-necked mouse (Apodemus flavicollis), genotypes Saaremaa and Kurkino in the striped field mouse (Apodemus agrarius), and genotype Sochi in the Black Sea field mouse (Apodemus ponticus).

In 2017 alone, the Robert Koch Institute (RKI) in Germany received 1,713 notifications of hantavirus infections.

North America

Canada
The primary cause of the disease in Canada is Sin Nombre virus-infected deer mice. Between 1989 and 2014,  109 confirmed cases were reported, with the death rate estimated at 29%. The virus exists in deer mice nationwide, but cases were concentrated in western Canada (British Columbia, Alberta, Saskatchewan, and Manitoba) with only one case in eastern Canada. In Canada, "[a]ll cases occurred in rural settings and approximately 70% of the cases have been associated with domestic and farming activities."

United States
In the United States, minor cases of HPS include Sin Nombre orthohantavirus, New York orthohantavirus, Bayou orthohantavirus, and possibly Black Creek Canal orthohantavirus.

, 728 cases of hantavirus had been reported in the United States cumulatively since 1995, across 36 states, not including cases with presumed exposure outside the United States. More than 96% of cases have occurred in states west of the Mississippi River. The top 10 states by number of cases reported (which differs slightly from a count ordered by the state of original exposure) were New Mexico (109), Colorado (104), Arizona (78), California (61), Washington (50), Texas (45), Montana (43), Utah (38), Idaho (21), and Oregon (21); 36% of the total reported cases have resulted in death.

Mexico
In Mexico, rodents have been found to carry hantaviruses include Thomas's giant deer mouse (Megadontomys thomasi), the pack rat Neotoma picta, Orizaba deer mouse (Peromyscus beatae), Western harvest mouse (Reithrodontomys megalotis) and Sumichrast's harvest mouse (Reithrodontomys sumichrasti).

South America
Agents of HPS found in South America include the Andes virus (also called Oran, Castelo de Sonhos – Portuguese for "Castle of Dreams", Lechiguanas, Juquitiba, Araraquara, and Bermejo virus, among many other synonyms), which is the only hantavirus that has shown an interpersonal form of transmission, and the Laguna Negra virus, an extremely close relative of the previously known Rio Mamore virus.

Rodents that have been shown to carry hantaviruses include Abrothrix longipilis and Oligoryzomys longicaudatus.

History
Hantavirus HFRS was likely first referenced in China in the 12th century. The first clinical recognition was in 1931 in northeast China. Around the same time in the 1930s, NE was identified in Sweden. HFRS came to the recognition of western physicians during the Korean War between 1951 and 1954 when more than 3,000 United Nations soldiers fell ill in an outbreak. In 1976, the first pathogenic hantavirus, the Hantaan orthohantavirus, was isolated from rodents near the Hantan River in South Korea. Other prominent hantaviruses that cause HFRS, including the Dobrava-Belgrade orthohantavirus, Puumala orthohantavirus, and Seoul orthohantavirus, were identified in the years after then and are collectively referred to as the Old World hantaviruses.

In 1993, an outbreak of HCPS, then unrecognized, occurred in the Four Corners region of the United States and led to the discovery of the Sin Nombre orthohantavirus. Since then, approximately 43 hantavirus strains, of which 20 are pathogenic, have been found in the Americas and are referred to as the New World hantaviruses. This includes the Andes orthohantavirus, one of the primary causes of HCPS in South America and the only hantavirus known to be capable of person-to-person transmission.

In late medieval England a mysterious sweating sickness swept through the country in 1485 just before the Battle of Bosworth Field. Noting that the symptoms overlap with hantavirus pulmonary syndrome, several scientists have theorized that the virus may have been the cause of the disease. The hypothesis was criticized because sweating sickness was recorded as being transmitted from human to human, whereas hantaviruses were not known to spread in this way.

See also

 1993 Four Corners hantavirus outbreak
 Bat-borne virus
 Cocoliztli epidemics
 Conjunctival suffusion
 Limestone Canyon virus
 List of cutaneous conditions

References

External links

 "Hantaviruses, with emphasis on Four Corners Hantavirus" by Brian Hjelle, M.D., Department of Pathology, School of Medicine, University of New Mexico
 CDC's Hantavirus Fact Sheet (PDF)
 CDC's Hantavirus Technical Information Index page
 Viralzone: Hantavirus
 Virus Pathogen Database and Analysis Resource (ViPR): Hantaviridae
 Occurrences and deaths in North and South America

Hantaviridae
Hemorrhagic fevers
Rodent-carried diseases
Viral diseases
Virus genera